Patricia White may refer to:

Patricia White (actress) (1922–2016), American performer, a/k/a Patricia Barry
Patricia Lorrain-Ann White (born 1928), Canadian-American ballerina, a/k/a Patricia Wilde
Patricia Lynne White (born 1964), Australian politician and business executive, a/k/a Trish White